Xicang Township (Mandarin: 西仓镇) is a township in Luqu County, Gannan Tibetan Autonomous Prefecture, Gansu, China. In 2010, Xicang Township had a total population of 2,927: 1,598 males and 1,329 females: 685 aged under 14, 1,957 aged between 15 and 65 and 285 aged over 65.

References 

Township-level divisions of Gansu
Gannan Tibetan Autonomous Prefecture